San Sebastián de los Reyes (colloquially called "Sanse") is a municipality in the Community of Madrid, Spain.

Geography 

It forms an urban continuum with the neighboring Alcobendas,

Transport 
San Sebastián de los Reyes, having direct communication with the A-1 motorway, has a connection with several bus lines that connect the city with Madrid and several towns in the Sierra Norte of Madrid. This line buses, along with urban ones, are the following:

 Urban line 2: Alcobendas - La Moraleja (by Paseo de Alcobendas) (Interbús)
 Urban line 4: Sports Center - Moscatelares (Interbús)
 Urban line 5: San Sebastián de los Reyes - Alcobendas - El Soto de la Moraleja (Interbús)
 Urban line 7: Alcobendas train station - Polígonos - Alcobendas train station (Interbús)
 Urban line 8: Alcobendas (train station) - Alcobendas (Arroyo de la Vega) (Interbús)
 151: Madrid (Plaza de Castilla) - Alcobendas (Interbús)
 152C: Madrid (Plaza de Castilla) - San Sebastián de los Reyes (Dehesa Vieja) (Interbús)
 153: Madrid (Plaza de Castilla) - Alcobendas - Rosa Luxemburgo (Interbús)
 154: Madrid (Chamartín) - San Sebastián de los Reyes (circular by Fuencarral) (Interbús)
 154C: Madrid (Plaza de Castilla) - San Sebastián de los Reyes (Quiñones Avenue) (Interbús)
 156: Madrid (Plaza de Castilla) - San Sebastián de los Reyes (Polígono Industrial Moscatelares) (Interbús)
 158: Madrid (Pinar de Chamartín) - Alcobendas-San Sebastián de los Reyes (Tempranales) (Interbús)
 161: Madrid (Plaza de Castilla) - Fuente del Fresno urbanization (Interbús)
 166: San Sebastián de los Reyes-Urbanización Valdelagua (Interbús)
 180: Alcobendas - Algete (Interbús)
 171: Madrid (Plaza de Castilla) - Santo Domingo urbanization (ALSA)
 191: Madrid (Plaza de Castilla) - Buitrago del Lozoya (ALSA)
 193: Madrid (Plaza de Castilla) - El Vellón (ALSA)
 194: Madrid (Plaza de Castilla) - Rascafría (ALSA)
 195: Madrid (Plaza de Castilla) - Braojos (ALSA)
 196: Madrid (Plaza de Castilla) - La Acebeda (ALSA)
 197: Madrid (Plaza de Castilla) - Uceda (ALSA)
 210: San Sebastián de los Reyes - Paracuellos de Jarama (ALSA)
 827: Madrid (Canillejas) - Tres Cantos (Doroteo Casado Montes)
 827A: Alcobendas - San Sebastián de los Reyes - University (Doroteo Casado Montes)
 Night bus line 102: Madrid (Plaza de Castilla) - San Sebastián de los Reyes (Interbús)
 Night bus line 103: Madrid (Plaza de Castilla) - Algete (Interbús)
 Night bus line 104: Madrid (Plaza de Castilla) - San Agustín del Guadalix (ALSA)

San Sebastián de los Reyes also shares a railway station with the neighboring municipality of Alcobendas. From this station you can go to the city of Madrid and to many other places such as Getafe or Parla.

Economy 
Major industrial companies have branches in San Sebastián de los Reyes, including IKEA, Leroy Merlin, PC City, Selther, Carrefour, Alternate, Media Markt, Telepizza, Antena 3, and many more.

Game developer MercurySteam is based here.

Sport 
The Jarama Circuit, located in the north of the municipality, hosted the Spanish Grand Prix and Spanish motorcycle Grand Prix between the 1960s and 1980s.
A women's soccer team, Madrid CFF, plays in the Primera División (women) but it has not gone well for them there. They are from Madrid, but their stadium is in San Sebastián.

Town twinning 
 Baunatal, Germany (since 1990)

References

External links 

Ayuntamiento de San Sebastián de los Reyes

Municipalities in the Community of Madrid